Weetwood is an electoral ward of Leeds City Council in north west Leeds, West Yorkshire, covering suburban areas including Far Headingley, Ireland Wood, Tinshill, Weetwood and West Park.

Councillors since 1980 

 indicates seat up for re-election.
 indicates councillor defection.
* indicates incumbent councillor.

Elections since 2010

May 2022

May 2021

May 2019

May 2018

May 2016

May 2015

May 2014

May 2012

May 2011

May 2010

See also
Listed buildings in Leeds (Weetwood Ward)

Notes

References

Wards of Leeds